Mohammad Hafez Ruhul Amin Madani (born 10 May 1971) is a Bangladeshi politician and the incumbent Member of Bangladesh Parliament from Mymensingh-7.

Career
Madani was elected to Parliament from Mymensingh-7 as a Bangladesh Awami League candidate on 30 December 2018. He is a member of the standing committee of Ministry of Religious Affairs.

References

Living people
11th Jatiya Sangsad members
Awami League politicians
1971 births
20th-century Bengalis
21st-century Bengalis